New Home is the name of several towns in the United States:

New Home Township, Missouri
New Home Township, North Dakota
New Home, Missouri
New Home, Texas